The Roman Catholic Territorial Prelature of El Salto (erected 10 June 1968) is a suffragan of the Archdiocese of Durango.

Ordinaries
Francisco Medina Ramírez,  (1973–1988)
Manuel Mireles Vaquera (1988–2005) - Prelate Emeritus
Ruy Rendón Leal (2005–2011), appointed Bishop of Matamoros, Tamaulipas
Juan María Huerta Muro,  (since 2012)

Episcopal See
El Salto, Durango

External links and references

El Salto
Territorial prelatures
El Salto, Roman Catholic Territorial Prelature of
El Salto
El Salto
1968 establishments in Mexico